The Advowsons Act 1708 (7 Ann c 18) was an Act of the Parliament of Great Britain.

Advowson is the right to nominate someone to a bishop to be appointed as minister to a particular church.

The whole Act was repealed by section 1 of, and Part II of the Schedule to, the Statute Law (Repeals) Act 1969.

References
Halsbury's Statutes,

Great Britain Acts of Parliament 1708